Marriage Lines is a British television sitcom first broadcast between 1963 and 1966. The series gave Richard Briers and Prunella Scales, its lead stars, a significant boost in their careers. At first titled The Marriage Lines, the programme was written by Richard Waring, and was later adapted for radio.

Cast
Richard Briers as George Starling
Prunella Scales as Kate Starling
Edward de Souza as Miles
Ronald Hines as Peter
Christine Finn as Norah
Diana King as Mrs Starling
Geoffrey Sumner as Mr Starling
Dorothy Black as Kate's mother

Background
When Richard Waring was writing Marriage Lines, he had Richard Briers in mind, and also worked with him on Brothers in Law. Graeme Muir, the producer of Marriage Lines, also worked on Brothers in Law. In early episodes, The Marriage Lines was subtitled A Quizzical Look at the Early Days of Married Life.

Plot
George and Kate Starling were a newly married couple, and the comedy came from many ordinary domestic situations. George was a junior clerk in an office and wanted the public house camaraderie of the single man in his office, while Kate got increasingly frustrated by her domestic duties. In the third series, Kate gave birth to a daughter, Helen. The last episode of the fourth series, "Goodbye George – Goodbye Kate", showed the couple going to live in Lagos, Nigeria because of George's job. This was meant to be the last episode, however a fifth series was commissioned. The Starlings returned to England as Kate was pregnant again, and gave birth in the final episode.

Episodes
All episodes were 25 minutes, except the fifth series, when the episodes were 30 minutes long. Many episodes are missing from the television archives.

Series One (1963)
"The Threshold" (16 August 1963)
"Trial Separation" (23 August 1963)
"The Bed" (30 August 1963)
"The Parting" (6 September 1963)
"Four-Part Harmony" (13 September 1963)
"The Old Flame" (20 September 1963)
"The Good Neighbours" (27 September 1963)
"Party Mood" (4 October 1963)
"The Anniversary" (11 October 1963)
"The Old Place" (18 October 1963)

Christmas Special (1963)
Short special as part of Christmas Night with the Stars (25 December 1963, missing)

Series Two (1964)
Entire series not known to survive.
"The Job" (22 May 1964)
"The Loan" (29 May 1964)
"Among Our Souvenirs" (5 June 1964)
"The Move" (12 June 1964)
"The Convention" (19 June 1964)
"Happy Birthday" (26 June 1964)
"Celebration Night" (28 June 1964)
"The Patient" (5 July 1964)
"The Martyr" (12 July 1964)
"Holiday Attractions" (19 July 1964)
"Financial Consideration" (26 July 1964)
"The Divorce" (2 August 1964)
"A Nice Surprise" (9 August 1964)

Christmas Special (1964)
Short special as part of Christmas Night with the Stars (25 December 64)

Series Three (1965)
"The Cuckoo" (5 January 1965)
"The Waiting Game" (12 January 1965)
"And Baby Makes Three" (19 January 1965)
"Nest of Starlings" (26 January 1965)
"The Ladies' Man" (2 February 1965)
"The Homecoming" (9 February 1965)
"Night of Nostalgia" (16 February 1965)

Series Four (1965)
Entire series not known to survive.
"What's in a Name" (22 August 1965)
"The Dinner" (29 August 1965)
"Serenade in Two Flats" (5 September 1965)
"Tropical Magic" (12 September 1965)
"Migration of Starlings" (19 September 1965)
"Goodbye George – Goodbye Kate" (26 September 1965)

Series Five (1966)
Entire series not known to survive, except where noted.
"The New Start" (22 April 1966)
"Back to the Beginning" (29 April 1966)
"Home Market" (6 May 1966)
"Big Business" (13 May 1966, sequence(s) exist)
"Alarums and Excursions" (20 May 1966)
"First House" (27 May 1966)
"And Then There Were Five" (3 June 1966)

DVD releases
Series One & Three were released on 4 February 2013.

Radio series

Marriage Lines was adapted for radio from 1965 to 1967, with Richard Briers and Prunella Scales once again starring. The scripts were also written by Richard Waring. The first series, of 13 episodes, ran from 21 May to 13 August 1965 and the second series, of 13 episodes, from 19 March to 11 June 1967.

The series was repeated on BBC Radio 4 Extra from 13 October 2014 onwards.

References

Mark Lewisohn, "Radio Times Guide to TV Comedy", BBC Worldwide 2003
British TV Comedy Guide for Marriage Lines

External links

1960s British sitcoms
1961 British television series debuts
1966 British television series endings
BBC Radio comedy programmes
BBC television sitcoms
Lost BBC episodes
Black-and-white British television shows
English-language television shows